All for One is a 2011 Danish comedy film directed by Rasmus Heide. In 2013 it was followed by All for Two.

Cast
 Jon Lange as Martin
 Jonatan Spang as Nikolai
 Rasmus Bjerg as Timo
 Mick Øgendahl as Ralf
 Lisa Werlinder as Sofie
 Charlotte Fich as Line
 Gordon Kennedy as Toke
 Signe Anastassia Mannov as Helle (as Signe A. Mannov)
 Kurt Ravn as Arno
 Mille Dinesen as Niemeyer's Wife
 Rutger Hauer as Niemeyer
 Søren Malling as Revisor

References

External links
 

2011 films
2011 comedy films
2010s Danish-language films
Danish comedy films